The FIL European Luge Championships 1992 took place in Winterberg, Germany for the second time, after hosting the event previously in 1982. It marked the first time East Germany and West Germany competed as a unified German team since the country reunified in 1990, and in the championships since 1939.

Men's singles

Women's singles

Men's doubles

Mixed team

Medal table

References

Men's doubles European champions
Men's singles European champions
Mixed teams European champions
Women's singles European champions

FIL European Luge Championships
1992 in luge
Luge in Germany
1992 in German sport